Coleophora intercalaris is a moth of the family Coleophoridae.

The larvae feed on Artemisia turanica and Artemisia badhysi. They feed on the leaves of their host plant.

References

intercalaris
Moths described in 1988